Roger Tien-hung Luo (commonly referred to as Roger Luo), is ambassador of the Republic of China (Taiwan) to Solomon Islands, preceded by Victor Yu.

Biography
After Luo successfully completed the special examination for diplomats in 1983, he joined the Ministry of Foreign Affairs. He had posts in the Philippines, Swaziland, and St. Vincent. He met Hsing Yun, the founder of Buddha's Light International Association, in 1999. Luo was based in Busan in South Korea for six years during which he shared over 1,000 photos and 360 travel stories on his blog "Having More Fun in Korea Than Koreans". He was the deputy director of the Bureau of Consular Affairs in 2014.

Luo was appointed the Taiwanese ambassador to the Solomon Islands, a position he served in between January 2017 to August 2019. His wife joined him when Frank Kabui, the Governor-General of Solomon Islands, received his diplomatic credentials. While stationed at various locations, he took part in numerous commemorative events related to war and viewed military antiques. He authored the book My Time in Solomon Islands: World War II Battleground through the eyes of an Ambassador, which was published in 2021. In a book review, Citi Cui of the China Times wrote, "After the author's careful study and on-the-spot observation, this book is easy to read, allowing readers to quickly understand the combat history of the United States and Japan in the Solomon Islands during World War II."

References

Ambassadors of the Republic of China to the Solomon Islands